Lauderdale County is the name of several counties in the United States:

 Lauderdale County, Alabama 
 Lauderdale County, Mississippi 
 Lauderdale County, Tennessee